Merry Meeting is a hamlet in the valley of the River Camel and in the parish of Blisland, Cornwall, England.

References

Hamlets in Cornwall